Cedar Unified School District is a school district based in Navajo County of northeastern Arizona.

The school district serves some unincorporated areas of Navajo County, including:
Hopi Reservation communities of First Mesa, Hotevilla-Bacavi,  Kykotsmovi Village, Second Mesa, and Shongopovi.
Navajo Nation community of Jeddito.
Town of Keams Canyon.
A portion of Whitecone

Schools
The lone school currently within the district is the Jeddito School, which serves grades K-8, in Jeddito on the Navajo Nation. 

White Cone High School, the first public district high school in Keams Canyon, opened in 2005 but fell victim to financial difficulties within the district and closed in 2012.

See also
Hopi Junior/Senior High School

References

External links
 

School districts in Navajo County, Arizona
Hopi Reservation
Education on the Navajo Nation